Zapotillo River is a river of eastern Mexico. It flows through the municipality of Xalapa, in the state of Veracruz. See El Zapotillo megadam project.

References

Rivers of Veracruz
Xalapa